"Stop Your Sobbing" is a song written by Ray Davies for the Kinks' debut album, Kinks.  It was later covered by the Pretenders as their first single.

Background
The Kinks recorded "Stop Your Sobbing" on Kinks, which was rushed out in order to capitalize on the success of "You Really Got Me." Kinks biographer Rob Jovanovic writes that "Stop Your Sobbing" was supposedly written by Ray about a former girlfriend who, fearing that fame would change him, broke down in tears upon seeing how popular he had become. Davies biographer Thomas Kitts instead suggests that the song may have been inspired by Davies having recently broken up with an old girlfriend.

The song has the singer upset that his girlfriend cries too much, and he wants her to stop. The singer's pleas fail and by the end of the song he remains frustrated at the unresolved situation.

AllMusic's Tom Maginnis described the track as "grounded more heavily in the classic 50s style of songwriting and playing," and said that "'Stop Your Sobbing' is a far cry from the wild aggression of ”You Really Got Me”."  Music critic Johnny Rogan described it as "a hidden gem in the Kinks canon."  Rogan praises how Davies' "fragile vocal" works well with the theme.  It was not released as a single.

A live version of the song appeared on One for the Road, and the studio version appeared on The Ultimate Collection.

The Pretenders version

In 1979, the Pretenders released their version of "Stop Your Sobbing" on their self-titled debut album. The recording of this cover of the song led to the relationship between Ray Davies and Chrissie Hynde of the Pretenders, which eventually resulted in the birth of a child. The Pretenders' version of "Stop Your Sobbing" was one of three demos given to Nick Lowe and became the A-side for the first single the band released. After this recording, Lowe abandoned the fledgling group claiming that the band was "not going anywhere". Lowe recalled of the experience:

Despite Lowe's skepticism, the single made the Top 40, reaching number 34 in the UK.  It didn't perform quite as well in the US, reaching number 65 on the Billboard Hot 100.

This version of the song was one of many examples of songs initially recorded by the Kinks that were covered by other bands during the late seventies and early eighties. Other examples include the version of "David Watts" recorded by the Jam, "The Hard Way" by the Knack, and "I Go to Sleep," an unreleased track written by Ray Davies, which, like "Stop Your Sobbing," was covered by the Pretenders.

Rolling Stone critic Ken Tucker calls the Pretenders' "Stop Your Sobbing" "ideal radio fare," describing it as having "Labour of Lust's feathery pop feel" and that "echoed to enhance Davies' wistful melancholy, Hynde sounded like a solo Mamas and the Papas, but her tone surged at the ends of choruses to imply enormous resentment at even having to think about sobbing."  Cash Box said that "Lowe's production captures the jangling guitars perfectly and Chrissie Hynde's vocals are confident yet sensual." Record World called it a "a contagious rocker that's...powerful pop."

Other versions
"Stop Your Sobbing" was the B-side of the single "Love Was on Your Mind" with the Swedish group Ola & the Janglers in 1966 (Gazell Records C-175).
"Stop Your Sobbin was released as a bonus live track on the Pete Yorn and Scarlett Johansson album Break Up in 2009.

References

Sources 

 
 

1964 songs
The Kinks songs
1979 debut singles
The Pretenders songs
Songs written by Ray Davies
Song recordings produced by Shel Talmy
Sire Records singles
Song recordings produced by Nick Lowe